Alberto Teta Lando (June 2, 1948 – July 14, 2008) was an Angolan musician.

Teta was born in Mbanza Congo, the capital city of Zaire Province in the north of the country, and is Bakongo. He is well known in Portuguese-speaking African countries and Portugal itself.

His music focused on Angolan identity, the country's civil war, the saudades (nostalgia, melancholy and longing) of Angolan exiles, as well as young love and family. He spoke and sung in both the Portuguese and Kikongo languages. Among his most well known songs were "Irmão ama teu irmão" ("Brother, Love Your Brother") and "Eu vou voltar" ("I Will Return").

During the last several years of his life, he managed to re-unite a group of many Angolan musicians.

He died in Paris, France, after battling cancer.

Discography
 Memórias 1968-1990 (Teta Lando Produções, Luanda, Angola)

References

20th-century Angolan male singers
1948 births
2008 deaths
Angolan Kongo people
Deaths from cancer in France
People from Zaire Province
21st-century Angolan male singers